Eyvandar (also Romanized as Eyvāndar; also known as Eyvān Darreh) is a village in Honam Rural District, in the Central District of Selseleh County, Lorestan Province, Iran. At the 2006 census, its population was 102, in 17 families.

References

Towns and villages in Selseleh County